De Familie van mijn Vrouw  is a 1935 Dutch comedy film directed by Jaap Speyer.

Cast

External links 
 

1935 films
Dutch black-and-white films
1935 comedy films
Films directed by Jaap Speyer
Dutch comedy films
1930s Dutch-language films